Sari Beygluy, also rendered as Sari Beyglar, may refer to:
 Sari Beygluy-e Araliq
 Sari Beygluy-e Cheragh
 Sari Beygluy-e Moin
 Sari Beygluy-e Musai